Brennen Michael-Kapono Carvalho (born December 31, 1985) is a former American football center. He was signed by the Green Bay Packers as an undrafted free agent in 2008. He played college football at Portland State.

Professional career

Pre-draft
Prior to the 2008 NFL Draft, Carvalho was projected to be a 7th round to undrafted by NFLDraftScout.com. He was rated as the 10th-best center in the draft. He was not invited to the NFL Scouting Combine, he posted the following numbers during his pro-day workouts at Portland State University:

Green Bay Packers
After going undrafted, Carvalho spent the 2008 season on the practice squad of the Green Bay Packers.

Arizona Rattlers
In 2010 and 2011, Carvalho played for the Arizona Rattlers of the Arena Football League.

Philadelphia Soul
Carvalho was assigned to the Philadelphia Soul for the 2012 season, where he anchored a line that lost ArenaBowl XXV. Carvalho has re-signed with the Soul for 2013. He was named a First-team All-Arena Selection following the 2013 season. In January 2014, Carvalho agreed to return to the Soul on a one-year deal.

Return to the Arizona Rattlers
On February 11, 2015, Carvalho was assigned to the Arizona Rattlers

Guangzhou Power
Carvalho was selected by the Guangzhou Power of the China Arena Football League (CAFL) in the second round of the 2016 CAFL Draft.

Philadelphia Soul
On May 1, 2017, Carvalho was assigned to the Philadelphia Soul. On August 26, 2017, the Soul beat the Tampa Bay Storm in ArenaBowl XXX by a score of 44–40.

References

External links

Green Bay Packers bio
Arizona Rattlers bio

1985 births
Living people
American football centers
Players of American football from Hawaii
People from Kauai County, Hawaii
Kamehameha Schools alumni
Portland State Vikings football players
Green Bay Packers players
Arizona Rattlers players
Philadelphia Soul players
Guangzhou Power players